Zbigniew Stroniarz (21 September 1943 – 31 August 2017) was a Polish footballer who played as a forward.

Career  
Stroniarz played at the youth level with Garbarnia Kraków from 1952 till 1960. In 1960, he played with SHL Kielce for three seasons, and played in the II liga with KS Cracovia in 1962. In 1964, he played in the Ekstraklasa with league rivals Legia Warsaw. He made his debut for Warsaw on August 16, 1964 against Zagłębie Sosnowiec. 

The following season he played in the Liga okręgowa with KS Lublinianka, and returned to Cracovia in 1967. Throughout his second stint with Cracovia he played in the Ekstraklasa, and II liga. In 1974, he played abroad in the National Soccer League with Toronto Polonia.

Personal life 
His brother Henryk Stroniarz was also a footballer. He died on August 31, 2017.

References 
 

1943 births
2017 deaths
Association football forwards
Polish footballers
MKS Cracovia (football) players
Legia Warsaw players
KS Lublinianka players
Ekstraklasa players
I liga players
II liga players
Canadian National Soccer League players
Footballers from Kraków
Polish expatriate footballers
Expatriate soccer players in Canada
Polish expatriate sportspeople in Canada